LBA or lba may refer to:

Science
 Live blood analysis, the observation of live blood cells through a dark field microscope
 Long branch attraction, an error in molecular phylogeny
 Ligand binding assay, an assay whose procedure relies on the binding of ligands to receptors, antibodies, and other macromolecules.

Technology
 Linear bounded automaton, a construct in computability theory
 Location-based advertising, a form of advertising in mobile telecommunications
 Logical block addressing, a method for specifying locations on computer storage devices

Transport
 Luftfahrt-Bundesamt, the national civil aviation authority of Germany
 Leeds Bradford Airport (IATA code: LBA), an airport in England

Sports
 Lega Basket Serie A, the top-tier level men's professional club basketball league in Italy.
 Libyan Olympic Committee (IOC code: LBA), the national Olympic committee of Libya

Other uses
 Ladakh Buddhist Association, a Buddhist organization in India
 Lairawn Baptist Association, a Baptist organization in Burma
 Late Bronze Age, an archaeological era
 Little Big Adventure, a 1994 video game
 Lui (ISO 639 code: lba), a variety of the Sak language

See also
 Iba (disambiguation)